The Feisnecksee or Feisneck is a lake on the southeastern perimeter of the town of Waren in Mecklenburgische Seenplatte district in the German state of Mecklenburg-Western Pomerania. It lies at an elevation of 62.1 metres and its surface area is 1.94 km².

The Feisnecksee is joined to the Binnenmüritz to the northwest by a very narrow, shallow and unnavigable ditch. The road runs over a small bridge here that is only wide enough for large vehicles to pass in one direction at a time. The land bridge is about 150 metres wide at this point. The lake is a typical, glacial tunnel valley lake and is divided by a neck and the larger Burgwall Island into a north and south basins. It is about 3,100 metres long and 600 metres wide. Near the southern half is the Waren quarter of Damerow. The lakeshore is completely surrounded by a belt of reed and is also wooded in the south. In the north half of the lake is a bathing area. Fishing is only allowed by special permit because the lake lies in the national park.

References

External links 
 

Lakes of Mecklenburg-Western Pomerania